Francis Payne (born 1953) is an Australian writer of speculative fiction.

Biography
Payne was born in 1953 in Scotland. In 1967 Payne emigrated to Australia. Payne won his first award in 1978 with his work "Albert's Bellyful" which won the Ditmar Award for best Australian short fiction. In 1995 he won the Aurealis Award for best horror short story with his chapbook "Olympia". Payne has a wife and child and is currently living outside Melbourne, Victoria, Australia.

Awards and nominations

Bibliography

Short fiction
"Albert's Bellyful" (1977) in Yggdrasil February 1977
"What the Stone of Ciparri Says" (1995) in ''Bloodsongs #6 (ed. Steve Proposch)
"Olympia" (1995)

References
General

Specific

1953 births
Living people
Australian male short story writers